Elbert Luther Little, Jr. (born October 15, 1907, in Fort Smith, Arkansas; died June 23, 2004) was an American botanist whose career spanned 70 years and largely concerned forest botany. Although he was born in Arkansas, and died in Oregon, he grew up in Muskogee, Oklahoma from the age of two and spent much of his life in Arlington, Virginia. Little served as Chief Dendrologist for the United States Forest Service from 1967 to 1975 and was the author of the National Audubon Society's Field Guide to Trees (1980). In life he was honored by the Oklahoma Forestry Association and the Oklahoma Academy of Science.

References 

People from Fort Smith, Arkansas
People from Muskogee, Oklahoma
1907 births
2004 deaths
American botanists
Dendrologists